Albert Lindon (1891-1976) was a football player and manager.

Lindon was a goalkeeper who played for Merthyr Town but was signed by Charlton Athletic as a player-manager after Alex MacFarlane's departure to Dundee in January 1928. Lindon only won one of his eleven games in charge, and became assistant manager when MacFarlane returned in summer 1928. In 1932 Lindon became manager again but was unable to prevent Charlton's relegation from the Second Division to the Third Division in 1933, and was replaced by Jimmy Seed.

External links
Albert Lindon profile from Charlton Athletic official website

English footballers
English football managers
Merthyr Town F.C. players
Merthyr Town F.C. managers
Charlton Athletic F.C. managers
Charlton Athletic F.C. players
1891 births
1976 deaths
Association football goalkeepers
Arsenal F.C. non-playing staff
Association football scouts